The 7th Micronesian Games was held August 1–10 in Palau.

Initially, the 7th Games were to be hosted in Majuro, Marshall Islands; however, in April 2008, the organisers announced that the Games could be "scaled down", with a number events cancelled due to a lack of facilities in Majuro. In May 2008, the Marshall Islands announced that it was withdrawing from hosting the competition. The hosting of the Games was subsequently awarded to Palau., which previously hosted the 1998 Games.

The Games were officially opened by the President of the Republic of Palau, Johnson Toribiong.  He participated at the first Micronesian Games 1969 in baseball, but for the Mariana Islands (now Northern Mariana Islands) team.  Before opening the Games, he also took part at this year's torch relay during the opening ceremony in the stadium.  Torch lighter was wrestler Elgin Loren Elwais, who participated for Palau at the 2008 Summer Olympics.

Participating countries

Sports
Participants competed in fifteen sports:

References

External links
 2010 Micronesian Games webpage

2010 in multi-sport events
Micro
2010
2010 in Oceanian sport
International sports competitions hosted by Palau
August 2010 sports events in Oceania